The Ethiopian Civil Aviation Authority (ECAA) is an agency of the Ministry of Transport and Communications of the Government of Ethiopia. It was established under Proclamation No. 273/2002.  

The Ethiopian Civil Aviation Accident Prevention and Investigation Bureau conducts aircraft accident investigations in Ethiopia or involving Ethiopian aircraft. The Flight Safety Department of the Ethiopian CAA conducted aircraft accident investigations in Ethiopia and/or involving Ethiopian aircraft.

History

The first aircraft flight in Ethiopia was the Potez 25, piloted by Frenchman André Millet, which landed just west of Addis Ababa from Djibouti in 1929.

In 1930, French instructor Gaston Vidal created an aviation school in Djidjiga which trained the first pilots and mechanics.

Ethiopia was one of the few African countries present at the Chicago Conference in December 1944 and to participate in the creation of the International Civil Aviation Organization. Ethiopian Airlines was soon after established in 1945 and operated just 6 DC-3s.

On 3 December 1996 the Direction Generale de l'Aviation Civile des Comores of the Comoros agreed to delegate the investigation of Ethiopian Airlines Flight 961 to the ECAA.

The investigation into the crash of the Boeing 737 MAX 8 serving Ethiopian Airlines Flight 302 on 10 March 2019 is led by the ECAA. They published the preliminary report on 4 April 2019.

References

External links
Ethiopian Civil Aviation Authority
Ethiopian Civil Aviation Authority (Archive)

Organizations investigating aviation accidents and incidents
Ethiopia
Government agencies of Ethiopia
Aviation organisations based in Ethiopia
Civil aviation in Ethiopia